Heart of England School is a secondary school and sixth form with academy status located in Balsall Common in the West Midlands. The Headteacher, who started at the start of the Academic year 2014, is Miss Hughes-Williams. She previously worked as a member of the school's senior leadership team.

Campus
It has 3 main blocks (Main block, Hampton block and Leveson block). The P.E. block, a part of main block, consists of a Dance Studio, a Gym, a Sports Hall and lessons also take place in the hall, tennis courts and field. The playing field abuts the Primary School field. Recent renovations have included a "Cyber Cafe" and "restaurant", improving the eating area for pupils. In September 2010 an extension to the Hampton Building was added to provide much needed specialist accommodation for Maths, Languages, Food Technology and Drama.

External links
Heart of England School
Solihull Council - Secondary Schools

Academies in Solihull
Secondary schools in Solihull